Marlene Jennings  (born November 10, 1951) is a former Canadian politician. She was a member of the Liberal Party of Canada in the House of Commons of Canada, and represented the riding of Notre-Dame-de-Grâce—Lachine from 1997 to 2011.

Jennings was born in Longueuil, Quebec. Her father, Preston Jennings,was Black American from Alabama and immigrated to Canada as a CPR Sleeping Car Porter. Her mother, Gilberte Garand was Franco-Manitoban of Belgian & French-Canadian ancestry. Jennings is a former lawyer and senior public servant. She is the former Parliamentary Secretary to the Minister for International Cooperation and the former Parliamentary Secretary to the Solicitor General of Canada. From 2004 to October 2005, she was Parliamentary Secretary to the Prime Minister with special emphasis on Canada-U.S. relations.

Jennings was the first Black woman from Quebec to be elected to Parliament. She was also one of the few parliamentarians with a physical disability, having become partially blind due to an illness in early 2010; she used visual aids and a white cane until late 2011. Over seven surgical procedures successfully restored her vision.

She is also a past member of the Girl Guides of Canada.

Electoral history

Jennings succeeded Warren Allmand, the MP for Notre-Dame-de-Grâce, in the reorganized riding of Notre-Dame-de-Grâce—Lachine upon its creation in 1997. She was elected five times in the riding with consistent margins of between 10,000 and 20,000 votes, and her riding was considered one of the safest Liberal seats in the country. However, she fell to Quebec's "orange wave" in the 2011 Canadian federal election, losing her seat to Isabelle Morin of the NDP.

Later life and career

In January 2012, it was reported that Jennings was considering an offer to run for the Coalition Avenir Québec in the 2012 Quebec general election. She ultimately declined. In a February 2012 Facebook post, Jennings explained that she had declined because she had never had a "passion" for provincial politics. For close to two years (2012 and 2013) she was the executive director of the Montreal YMHA. She had let her Liberal Party of Canada party membership lapse but re-joined in 2014.

Source: Elections Canada

|align="left" colspan=2|Liberal hold
|align="right"|Swing
|align="right"| +1.0%
|align="right"|

|align="left" colspan=2|Liberal hold
|align="right"|Swing
|align="right"| -3.85%
|align="right"|

			
Note: Conservative vote is compared to the total of the Canadian Alliance vote and Progressive Conservative vote in 2000 election.

Note: Canadian Alliance vote is compared to the Reform vote in 1997 election.

References

External links
Official website
Official Youtube Channel
Official Twitter Site
Facebook Page

1951 births
Anglophone Quebec people
Black Canadian politicians
Women members of the House of Commons of Canada
Lawyers in Quebec
Liberal Party of Canada MPs
Living people
Members of the House of Commons of Canada from Quebec
People from Longueuil
Women in Quebec politics
Blind politicians
Université du Québec à Montréal alumni
Canadian blind people
Canadian women lawyers
Black Canadian lawyers
Blind lawyers
Canadian politicians with disabilities
Black Canadian women
20th-century Canadian lawyers
21st-century Canadian politicians
21st-century Canadian women politicians
20th-century women lawyers
20th-century Canadian women politicians